Narapati of Mrauk U  (Arakanese: နာရပတိ (မြောက်ဦး); whose personal name Nga-Kuthala (ငကုသလ), was a king of the Mrauk-U Dynasty of Arakan. He was a great-grandson of Min Bin. When Min Sanay died from smallpox, he seized the throne for himself and bore the title of Narapati which means "Lord of the people". To secure his accession, Narapati murdered many royal relatives and nobles, causing targeted survivors to flee to Chittagong.

In Narapati's reign, the military might of Mrauk U began to dwindle. However, one of the achievements of Narapati was that he established diplomatic ties with Ava in 1640. He did not maintain good relations with the Dutch for trade. The king ruled until his death in 1644, with his son Thado succeeding him.

Third Mrauk U period 

With the military might of the Mrauk U Kingdom dwindling, the dynasty saw its last era.

References

(1) A history of rakhineland in brief By Aung Hla Thein

(2) New arakanese chronicle By Ven. Candamālālaṇkāra

Monarchs of Mrauk-U
17th century in Burma
17th-century Burmese monarchs
1645 deaths